Valentin Naydenov Ivanov (Bulgarian: Валентин Найденов Иванов) (born 27 July 1972) is a Bulgarian former footballer.

Biography

Naydenov has played for numerous clubs in Bulgaria, including CSKA Sofia, Litex Lovech, Loko Sofia, Chernomorets Burgas, Neftochimic, Spartak Varna, Botev Vratsa, Loko Mezdra, Vihar Gorublyane, Slivnishki Geroy, Hebar Pazardzhik and Kom Berkovitsa.

He also had a successful spell with New Radiant from the Maldives.  Naydenov has been capped for the national team.

He is married and has three children.

References

1972 births
Living people
People from Berkovitsa
Association football defenders
Bulgarian footballers
Bulgaria international footballers
First Professional Football League (Bulgaria) players
PFC CSKA Sofia players
PFC Litex Lovech players
FC Lokomotiv 1929 Sofia players
FC Chernomorets Burgas players
Neftochimic Burgas players
PFC Spartak Varna players
FC Botev Vratsa players
PFC Lokomotiv Mezdra players
FC Hebar Pazardzhik players
Bulgarian expatriate footballers
Bulgarian expatriate sportspeople in the Maldives